Manpreet Kaur (born 16 August 1990) is an Indian footballer who plays as a midfielder for Kickstart FC Karnataka. She has been a member of the India women's national team.

Club career
Playing for Railways, Manpreet scored a brace during the semifinal match of the 2015–16 Senior Women's National Football Championship. Her team would eventually become champion.

International career
Manpreet capped for India at senior level during the 2014 SAFF Women's Championship.

Honours

India
 SAFF Women's Championship: 2010, 2014

Railways
 Senior Women's National Football Championship: 2015–16

References

1990 births
Footballers from Chandigarh
Living people
India women's international footballers
Indian women's footballers
Women's association football midfielders
Gokulam Kerala FC Women players